Seth Hastings (April 8, 1762 – November 19, 1831) was a United States representative from Massachusetts. Born in Cambridge in the Province of Massachusetts Bay to Seth and Hannah (Soden) Hastings, he was a descendant of the colonist Thomas Hastings who came from the East Anglia region of England to the Massachusetts Bay Colony in 1634.  He graduated from Harvard University in 1782, studied law, was admitted to the bar in 1786 and commenced practice in Mendon, Massachusetts. He was town treasurer in 1794 and 1795, and was elected one of the first school commissioners in 1796.

Hastings was elected as a Federalist to the Seventh Congress to fill the vacancy caused by the resignation of Levi Lincoln. He was reelected to the Eighth and Ninth Congresses and served from August 24, 1801, to March 3, 1807. He declined to be a candidate for renomination in 1806 and was a member of the Massachusetts State Senate in 1810 and 1814. From 1819 to 1828, he was chief justice of the court of sessions for Worcester County. Hastings died in Mendon; interment was in the Old Cemetery.

Legacy
Hastings' son, William Soden Hastings, also represented Massachusetts in the House of Representatives.

References

Buckminster, Lydia N. H., The Hastings Memorial, A Genealogical Account of the Descendants of Thomas Hastings of Watertown, Mass. from 1634 to 1864, Boston: Samuel G. Drake Publisher (an undated NEHGS photoduplicate of the 1866 edition).

External links
 Descendants of Thomas Hastings website
 Descendants of Thomas Hastings on Facebook

 Seth Hastings and Seth Hastings, Jr. commonplace books, medical records, and papers, 1772-1830 (inclusive), undated. H MS c292. Harvard Medical Library, Francis A. Countway Library of Medicine, Boston, Mass.

1762 births
1831 deaths
Harvard University alumni
Massachusetts state senators
Massachusetts state court judges
People from Mendon, Massachusetts
Federalist Party members of the United States House of Representatives from Massachusetts
Politicians from Cambridge, Massachusetts